Rafael dos Santos Lacerda, sometimes known as just Lacerda (born 12 June 1984), is a Brazilian football manager and former player who played as a central defender. He is the current manager of Amazonas.

Career
Born in São Leopoldo, Rio Grande do Sul, Lacerda began his career with local Ulbra, and continued to appear in his native state until 2008, representing Brasil de Farroupilha and Sapucaiense. After a brief period in Paraná, playing for Toledo CW, he returned to Sapucaiense, and shortly after signed with Caxias.

In August 2009 Lacerda signed with Joinville. In June of the following year he finally left his native region and signed with Luverdense. After loan stints to ASA and Red Bull Brasil, Lacerda returned to Caxias in December 2011.

On 15 May 2012 Lacerda signed with Série B side Goiás. He made his professional debut on 7 July, starting in a 3–3 away draw against Bragantino. Lacerda contributed with six appearances (five starts) with his side being crowned champions.

On 6 September 2013 Lacerda signed with Portuguesa.

On 28 July 2017, Hong Kong Premier League club Yuen Long announced on Facebook that they had signed Lacerda. However, Lacerda left the club the following month.

Honours
Campeonato Gaúcho Segunda Divisão: 2003, 2007.
Copa Santa Catarina: 2009
Campeonato Brasileiro Série B: 2012

References

External links
 

1984 births
Living people
People from São Leopoldo
Brazilian footballers
Association football defenders
Campeonato Brasileiro Série B players
Campeonato Brasileiro Série C players
Campeonato Brasileiro Série D players
Canoas Sport Club players
Sociedade Esportiva Recreativa e Cultural Brasil players
Toledo Esporte Clube players
Sociedade Esportiva e Recreativa Caxias do Sul players
Joinville Esporte Clube players
Luverdense Esporte Clube players
Agremiação Sportiva Arapiraquense players
Red Bull Brasil players
Goiás Esporte Clube players
Associação Portuguesa de Desportos players
Paysandu Sport Club players
Clube Esportivo Aimoré players
Sport Club São Paulo players
Esporte Clube São Luiz players
Concórdia Atlético Clube players
Brazilian football managers
Campeonato Brasileiro Série D managers
Sociedade Esportiva e Recreativa Caxias do Sul managers
Clube Esportivo Aimoré managers
Sportspeople from Rio Grande do Sul
Amazonas Futebol Clube managers